The 1982–83 season was the 84th of competitive league football in the history of Wolverhampton Wanderers. They finished runners-up in the Second Division to win promotion back to the First Division after one season away.

Season summary
Wolves were relegated from the First Division at the end of the 1981–82 season and went into receivership as financial difficulties following construction of the new John Ireland stand caught up with them. They came close to liquidation but were saved at the eleventh hour by a consortium fronted by former player Derek Dougan.

Dougan sacked manager Ian Greaves and replaced him with former Wolves teammate Graham Hawkins. Hawkins named Jim Barron as his assistant and put Frank Upton in charge of the youth team with a brief that young players would be important to the first team due to the club's tight budget. Indeed, four teenagers – Ian Cartwright, Paul Butler, Billy Livingstone and Dave Wintersgill – made their debuts against Blackburn Rovers on the opening day of the new season.

Wolves were unbeaten for the first 10 matches and also went 817 minutes without conceding a league goal. Both runs ended at home to Leicester City on 16 October, the first of five defeats in seven matches, but an 11-match unbeaten run followed and a 3–0 win over Leeds United on 3 January took Wolves six points clear at the top of the division. Promotion was secured by a 3–3 draw at Charlton Athletic on 2 May, despite Wolves struggling for form in the latter half of the campaign and eventually finishing 10 points behind champions Queens Park Rangers.

Squad
Substitute appearances indicated in brackets

Second Division

Results

Second Division

Milk Cup

FA Cup

References

Bibliography
 
 
 

Wolverhampton Wanderers F.C. seasons
1982 in English sport
1983 in English sport